Stuart and Suzanne Grant Stadium is a soccer specific stadium with a track located in Newark, Delaware on the campus of the University of Delaware.  Prior to 2014, it was known as Delaware Mini-Stadium.  Both the track and stands were renovated in 2014 following a gift from the Grants that was the largest in Delaware athletics history

See also
Delaware Stadium

References

Athletics (track and field) venues in Delaware
College soccer venues in the United States
Soccer venues in Delaware
Newark, Delaware
Sports venues completed in 2014
2014 establishments in Delaware